The M'era Luna is a gothic festival that encompasses a number of different styles such as metal, future pop, aggrotech, synthpop, gothic rock, dark wave, and ebm. It is held annually on the second weekend of every August, in Hildesheim, Germany at Flugplatz Hildesheim-Drispenstedt, a former British Army airbase.

The M'era Luna includes camping facilities and has two stages: a large rock festival style structure, erected for the show each year, and a former aircraft hangar.

With its 20,000–25,000 regular attendants (21,000 in 2005, 23,000 in 2009, 24,000 in 2010) (many flying in via the Hanover airport, with others traveling via road and railway), the M'era Luna is one of the biggest dark music events in Germany. 
The festival's logo is based on the image of the moon from the 1902 film A Trip to the Moon by French director Georges Méliès. An altered version of the logo was introduced for the 2019 festival.

Line-ups
2000: The Sisters of Mercy, HIM, And One, The Mission, Marc Almond, Faith and the Muse, Tiamat, Anathema, Haggard, Umbra et Imago, L'Âme Immortelle, The Cassandra Complex, Die Krupps, The Godfathers, Suicide Commando, Lithium, Letzte Instanz, The 69 Eyes, The House of Usher, Unknown, Zeromancer, Fields of the Nephilim, Project Pitchfork, Phillip Boa & The Voodooclub, Anne Clark, VNV Nation, Oomph!, Rosenfels, Velvet Acid Christ, Funker Vogt, Evil's Toy, Aenima, Estampie, Diary of Dreams, Illuminate, Stromkern, Mila Mar, Merlons, Near Dark.
2001: Z.e.t.a.X, Inscape, Pinko Star, Schock, Clan of Xymox, Fading Colours, Zeromancer, Star Industry, Gary Numan, Poems for Laila, Goethes Erben, Lucyfire, Theatre of Tragedy, Lacuna Coil, De/Vision, Letzte Instanz, The 69 Eyes, Justin Sullivan, Covenant, The Inchtabokatables, Wolfsheim, Escape with Romeo, Beborn Beton, T.O.Y., Icon of Coil, Yvonne, Obscyre, Inkubus Sukkubus, S.P.O.C.K., Atrocity, Melotron, Subway to Sally, Terminal Choice, Apoptygma Berzerk, In Strict Confidence, Paradise Lost, Mesh, The Cult, L'Âme Immortelle, Marilyn Manson.
2002: Zeraphine, Culture Kultür, The Cascades, Sonar, Pinkostar, Angels and Agony, Tanzwut, Pzycho Bitch, Sulpher, Seabound, Rosenfels, Assemblage 23, L'Âme Immortelle, Welle: Erdball, In Extremo, Blutengel, The 69 Eyes, Hocico, VNV Nation, Suicide Commando, The Sisters of Mercy, Care Company, Z.e.t.a.X, The Bloodflowerz, Elusive, Schandmaul, Carpe Diem, Within Temptation, Ataraxia, Funker Vogt, After Forever, Oomph!, Das Ich, Ikon, Nosferatu, London After Midnight, The Gathering, Soft Cell, Therion, HIM.
2003: Placebo, Nightwish, Apocalyptica, Project Pitchfork, Deine Lakaien, Killing Joke, Apoptygma Berzerk, Phillip Boa & The Voodooclub feat. Pia Lund, Subway to Sally, Within Temptation, Camouflage, Blutengel, Terminal Choice, Mesh, Diary of Dreams, In Strict Confidence, Wayne Hussey, Melotron, Unheilig, The Crüxshadows, Red Lorry Yellow Lorry, After Forever, Illuminate, Haujobb, Neuroticfish, Dive, Mila Mar, Qntal, Lithium, Autumn, Evereve, Zeraphine, Gothminister, Xandria, nCor, [:SITD:], Chillburn, Hekate, Colony 5, The Breath Of Life.
2004: Oomph!, Wolfsheim, Anne Clark, ASP, Funker Vogt, Covenant, Suicide Commando, The Fair Sex, Blutengel, Within Temptation, Fixmer/McCarthy, In Strict Confidence, The Eternal Afflict, Rotersand, Decoded Feedback, Welle: Erdball, Samsas Traum, Faith and the Muse, Gothminister, Schandmaul, Pink Turns Blue, Chamber, Elis, Cold, Lacrimosa, Therion, De/Vision, Exilia, Warren Suicide, Icon of Coil, Soman, In Extremo, L'Âme Immortelle, The Mission, Tristania, Fiddler's Green, Umbra et Imago, Epica, Saltatio Mortis, Flowing Tears.
2005: The Sisters of Mercy, Deine Lakaien, Skinny Puppy, VNV Nation, Hocico, Mesh, Klinik, Diary of Dreams, Subway to Sally, Lacuna Coil, Zeraphine, The Birthday Massacre, Gåte, Faun, The Vision Bleak, Scream Silence, Melotron, Flesh Field, Trisomie 21, Amduscia, KiEw, Cephalgy, Staubkind, Combichrist, The Neon Judgement, [:SITD:], Atrocity, Leaves' Eyes, Potentia Animi, Qntal, Klimt 1918, Schandmaul, The 69 Eyes, The Crüxshadows, NFD, Autumn, Negative, Limbogott, Osiris Taurus, In mitra medusa inri.
2006: Sono, Northern Lite, Gothminister, Girls Under Glass, Mesh, Funker Vogt, Die Krupps, Blutengel, Front Line Assembly, Nitzer Ebb, Bauhaus, Mona Mur, Elane, Clan of Xymox, Epica, Letzte Instanz, The Birthday Massacre, Apoptygma Berzerk, Ministry, In Extremo, Within Temptation, Lluther, Regicide, Midnattsol, Dope Stars Inc., Liv Kristine, Unheilig, Samsas Traum, Tristania, Deathstars, The Gathering, Solitary Experiments, XPQ-21, Soman, Spetsnaz, Rotersand, In Strict Confidence, Terminal Choice, De/Vision, ASP.
2007: 32 Crash, And One, Angels and Agony, Animal Alpha, Anne Clark, Assemblage 23, Big Boy, Blitzkid, Bloodpit, Client, Covenant, Cultus Ferox, Deine Lakaien und Die Neue Philharmonie Frankfurt, Diorama, Dir En Grey, Down Below, Emilie Autumn, Fair to Midland, IAMX, Implant, Jesus on Extasy, Krypteria, Lacrimas Profundere, My Dying Bride, Necro Facility, Nosferatu, Pain, Proceed, Rabia Sorda, Schandmaul, Skinny Puppy, Suicide Commando, The 69 Eyes, The Crüxshadows, The Jesus and Mary Chain, The LoveCrave, Tool, Warren Suicide, Welle: Erdball.
2008: Fields of the Nephilim, New Model Army, Moonspell, Epica, Apoptygma Berzerk, VNV Nation, Front 242, Samael, Combichrist, Hocico, Tanzwut, Mesh, Deutsch Amerikanische Freundschaft, Delain, ASP, Unheilig, The Legendary Pink Dots, Elis, Blitzkid, Cinema Strange, Saltatio Mortis, Ordo Rosarius Equilibrio, Eisbrecher, Agonoize, The Vision Bleak, Elegant Machinery, Rabenschrey, End of Green, Frank the Baptist, Painbastard, The Other, Irfan, Akanoid, Klimt 1918, Paradise Lost.
2009: Alexander Veljanov, Apocalyptica, Ashbury Heights, Blutengel, Deathstars, De/Vision, Die Apokalyptischen Reiter, Faderhead, Frozen Plasma, Grendel, Heimataerde, IAMX, Jesus on Extasy, Krypteria, L'Âme Immortelle, Leichtmatrose, Letzte Instanz, Lola Angst, Mina Harker, Nachtmahr, Nightwish, No More, Oomph!, Peter Heppner, Schelmish, Scream Silence, [:SITD:], Spetsnaz, Star Industry, Subway to Sally, The Birthday Massacre, The Crüxshadows, The Prodigy, Tiamat, Tyske Ludder, Untoten, Welle: Erdball, Whispers in the Shadow, Zeraphine, Zeromancer
2010: Agonoize, Ambassador21, Amduscia, Angelspit, Brendan Perry, Celine and Nite Wreckage, Colony 5, Combichrist, Crematory, Das Ich, Editors, Eluveitie, Faith and the Muse, Feindflug, Hanzel und Gretyl, Ignis Fatuu, Illuminate, In Extremo, Lacrimas Profundere, Leandra, Nitzer Ebb, Placebo, Punish Yourself, Rabenschrey, Rotersand, Saltatio Mortis, Samsas Traum, Skinny Puppy, Stolen Babies, The 69 Eyes, The Other, The Sisters of Mercy, Unheilig, Zeraphine
2011: A Life Divided, Apocalyptica, ASP, Atari Teenage Riot, Blind Passenger, Coppelius, End of Green, Equilibrium, Fetisch:Mensch, Funker Vogt, Gothminister, Hurts, Julien-K, Mesh, Mono Inc., My Dying Bride, Nachtmahr, Project Pitchfork, Tanzwut, Teufel, The Beauty Of Gemina, Tiamat, Tying Tiffany, VNV Nation, Within Temptation, The Mission Veo.
2012: Placebo, In Extremo, Subway To Sally, Schandmaul, Fields Of The Nephilim, Eisbrecher, Megaherz, Diary Of Dreams, Suicide Commando, De/Vision, Leæther Strip, Welle: Erdball, KMFDM, The Beauty Of Gemina, Faun, Amduscia, Letzte Instanz, Lacrimas Profundere, Rabia Sorda, Noisuf-X, Heimataerde, Roterfield, Lahannya, Jäger 90, Les Jupes.
2013: Nightwish, HIM, ASP, Front 242, Front Line Assembly, Deine Lakaien, Blutengel, Apoptygma Berzerk, Mono Inc., The Crüxshadows, Staubkind, Saltatio Mortis, Tanzwut, Klinik, IAMX (cancelled), End Of Green, [:SITD:], Nachtmahr, Kirlian Camera, Haujobb, Diorama, Clan Of Xymox, Coppelius, Ost+Front, Eisenfunk, Lord of the Lost, Unzucht, ASP & Kai Meyer, Markus Heitz, Boris Koch, Christian von Aster, u.v.a., Molllust.
2014: Within Temptation, And One, Marilyn Manson, In Extremo, Deine Lakaien, Subway To Sally, ASPs von Zaubererbrüdern, Paradise Lost, Lacrimas Profundere, Covenant, Faun, Die Krupps, Combichrist, De/Vision, DAF, Leæther Strip, Hocico, Letzte Instanz, Das Ich, Stahlmann, Spetsnaz, Darkhaus, X-RX, Rabia Sorda, Neuroticfish, Solitary Experiments, Ignis Fatuu, Heimataerde, Solar Fake, Chrom, Feuerschwanz, The Beauty Of Gemina, Henke, Ambassador21, Sündenklang, Meinhard, microClocks
2015: Nightwish, ASP, Rob Zombie, Einsturzende Neubauten, Blutengel, Phillip Boa and the Voodooclub, Mono Inc, Saltatio Mortis, Apoptygma Berzerk, L'Âme Immortelle, Anne Clark feat. Herrb, X-RX, Joachim Witt, Deathstars, Tanzwut, Rotersand, In Strict Confidence, Lord of the Lost, Nachtmahr, Dope Stars Inc., Aesthetic Perfection, Assemblage 23, Tying Tiffany, Merciful Nuns, Melotron, Absolute Body Control, Ost+Front, Coppelius, Unzucht, Frozen Plasma, Tyske Ludder, Versengold, The Other, Schwarzer Engel, Spielbann, Nachtgeschrei, Private Pact, Elvellon
2016: Within Temptation, The Sisters of Mercy, In Extremo, VNV Nation, Lacrimosa, Eisbrecher, Apocalyptica, The Lord of The Lost Ensemble, Faun, Diary of Dreams, OOMPH!, Combichrist, IAMX, Hocico, Die Krupps, Suicide Commando, Lacrimas Profundere, Letze Instanz, [:SITD:], Zeromancer, Diorama, S.P.O.C.K, Gothminister, Stahlmann, Cassandra Complex, Beborn Beton, Noisuf-X, Centhron, Rabia Sorda, Hämatom, Agent Side Grinder, Heldmaschine, A Life Divided, Chrom, Me The Tiger, Aeverium, Erdling, Vlad In Tears, Essence of Mind, Shaârghot, Christian Von Aster, Luci van Org, Markus Heitz
2017: Markus Heitz, Alexander Wohnhaas, Unzucht, Mesh, White Lies, Project Pitchfork, Subway to Sally, ASP, Korn, Schwarzer Engel, Darkhaus, Versengold, Megaherz, The Crûxshadows, Mono Inc., Schandmaul, Blutengel, And One
2018: The Prodigy, Eisbrecher, Peter Heppner. In Extremo, Ministry, Apoptygma Berzerk, London After Midnight, Lord of the Lost, The 69 Eyes, In Strict Confidence, Nachtmahr, Tanzwut, Zeraphine, Welle:Erdball, Clan of Xymox, Das Ich, Rabia Sorda, Merciful Nuns, Erdling, Eisfabrik, Cephalgy, Whispering Sons, Cyborg, Front 242, Saltatio Mortis, L'Âme Immortelle, Hocico, Atari Teenage Riot, Rotersand, Lacrimas Profundere, Bannkreis, Aesthetic Perfection, Die Kammer, Heimatærde, Massive Ego, Schattenmann, Too Dead To Die
2019: ASP, VNV Nation, Within Temptation. Die Krupps, [:SITD], Lacrimosa, Zeromancer, Mono Inc., Agonoize, Oomph!, Neuroticfish, Corvus Corax, Deathstars, Stahlmann, Terrolokaust, Sono, Null Positiv, Suicide Commando, Fields Of The Nephilim, De/Vision, Subway To Sally, Assemblage 23, Joachim Witt, Spetsnaz, Combichrist, Funker Vogt, Diary Of Dreams, Melotron, Versengold, Heldmaschine, Faelder, Formalin, Scarlet Dorn, Yellow Lazarus, .

See also
List of gothic festivals
List of industrial music festivals
List of heavy metal festivals
Zillostrierte Music Magazine

References

External links

Official M'era Luna Festival website

Electronic music festivals in Germany
Rock festivals in Germany
Industrial music festivals
Goth festivals
Goth subculture